Kuhle may refer to:

People
 Birgithe Kühle (1762–1832), Danish-Norwegian journalist
 Konstantin Kuhle (born 1989), German politician
 Kuhle Sonkosi (born 1992), South African rugby union player
 Matthias Kuhle (1948–2015), German geographer
 Søren Anton van der Aa Kühle (1849–1906), Danish brewer

See also
 Kuhle Wampe